The sharpnose sand eel (Ichthyapus acuticeps) is an eel in the family Ophichthidae (worm/snake eels). It was described by Keppel Harcourt Barnard in 1923, originally under the genus Sphagebranchus. It is a marine, subtropical eel which is known from Zululand and Durban in South Africa, in the western Indian Ocean.

References

Ophichthidae
Fish described in 1923